Temurah may refer to:

 Temurah (Kabbalah), a method, used by the Kabbalists to rearrange words and sentences in the Bible;
 Temurah (Halacha), the prohibition against attempting to switch the sanctity of one animal for another;
 Temurah (Talmud), the Talmudic tractate dealing with the laws of Temurah (Halacha);
 Midrash Temurah, one of the smaller midrashim, consisting of three chapters.